A constitutional referendum was held in Ivory Coast (which included Upper Volta at the time) on 21 October 1945 as part of the wider French constitutional referendum. Both questions were approved by large margins. Voter turnout was 74.9%.

Results

Question I

Question II

References

1945 referendums
October 1945 events in Africa
1945
1945 in French Upper Volta
1945
1945 in Ivory Coast
Constitutional referendums in France